Ian Ethan Maatsen (born 10 March 2002) is a Dutch professional footballer who plays as a left-back for Burnley, on loan from Chelsea.

Club career

Early career 
Maatsen joined Feyenoord's academy at the age of 7, but was dropped for allegedly being too small. He moved to Sparta Rotterdam and then PSV Eindhoven, before joining Chelsea in 2018.

Chelsea 
On 25 September 2019, he made his debut for the London club as a substitute in a 7–1 EFL Cup victory over Grimsby Town.

Loan to Charlton Athletic 
On 13 October 2020, Maatsen joined Charlton Athletic on a season-long loan. On 20 October, he made his league debut for Charlton, coming off the bench as a second-half substitute in the side's 1–0 win over Blackpool. He scored his first senior goal on 2 April 2021 in a 1–0 away win over Doncaster Rovers.

Loan to Coventry 
On 30 July 2021, Maatsen joined Coventry City on loan. On 2 October 2021, he scored his first goal for Coventry in a match against Fulham, helping his team to a 4–1 victory. Overall, Maatsen made 40 league appearances for the Sky Blues and scored 3 goals during the 2021–22 season.

Loan to Burnley 
On 15 July 2022, Maatsen joined Burnley on a season-long loan. He made his debut in the first round of the 2022–23 EFL Championship against Huddersfield Town, where he also scored the only goal of the game in a 1–0 win. Following his impressive performances, Maatsen was named the EFL Championship Player of the Month for January 2023.

International career
Born in the Netherlands, Maatsen is of Surinamese descent. He is a youth international for the Netherlands, having represented the country at all levels from under-15 to under-21.

Career statistics

Honours
Netherlands U17
UEFA European Under-17 Championship: 2019

Individual
EFL Championship Player of the Month: January 2023

References

2002 births
Living people
People from Vlaardingen
Dutch footballers
Netherlands youth international footballers
Netherlands under-21 international footballers
Association football fullbacks
Feyenoord players
Sparta Rotterdam players
PSV Eindhoven players
Chelsea F.C. players
Charlton Athletic F.C. players
Coventry City F.C. players
Burnley F.C. players
Eerste Divisie players
English Football League players
Dutch expatriate footballers
Expatriate footballers in England
Dutch expatriate sportspeople in England
Dutch sportspeople of Surinamese descent